Emma Jane Reeves is a Welsh screenwriter and playwright, best known for her extensive work in children's television series such as the Tracy Beaker franchise.

Early life and education
Reeves grew up in Wrexham. She gained a degree in English from Magdalen College, Oxford and an MA in creative writing from the University of East Anglia.

Career
Reeves has written extensively for theatre, including shows based on material she would also work on in television, such as Hetty Feather and The Worst Witch, as well as adaptations of Cool Hand Luke and Little Women. In 2005, she moved into television, gaining her first credit on BBC One's Doctors. She became a prolific children's writer following working on The Story of Tracy Beaker, writing for series like Half Moon Investigations, Chuggington and Young Dracula. She would return to the Tracy Beaker franchise several times, writing for Tracy Beaker Returns, spin-off The Dumping Ground and in 2021, My Mum Tracy Beaker. This was followed by The Beaker Girls that same year.

In 2015, she co-created with David Chikwe the CBBC science-fiction series Eve. It starred Poppy Lee Friar that follows the adventures of a gynoid, a female android, named Eve (also known as Project Eternity) living with a family in suburbia, trying to make sense of human life as a teenage girl. It concluded on 14 December 2016 with an hour-long episode, which was later split into two parts when it was repeated in January 2017. Reeves developed and wrote a new adaptation of The Worst Witch, which ran for four series between 2017 and 2020. She would win 'Best British Children's Television' at the British Screenwriters' Awards for her work. In 2019, she helmed a sequel-reboot of The Demon Headmaster for CBBC. It has been renewed for a second series.

Reeves has written audio plays for the Big Finish Doctor Who ranges, starting with Torchwood: Forgotten Lives  in 2015. She also wrote for the spin-offs The Diary of River Song and The New Adventures of Bernice Summerfield .

References

External links
 

Living people
Alumni of Magdalen College, Oxford
Alumni of the University of East Anglia
21st-century British women writers
21st-century Welsh women writers
Welsh dramatists and playwrights
Welsh screenwriters
Welsh television writers
Welsh women dramatists and playwrights
Welsh science fiction writers
British women television writers
Women science fiction and fantasy writers
Year of birth missing (living people)